Jaime José Serra Puche (born January 11, 1951 in Mexico City) is a Mexican economist. He is a Partner of the SAI Law and Economics firm in Mexico (sai.com.mx). His professional practice includes the design of investment strategies in Mexico for foreign companies and advice to Mexican companies interested in becoming regional players in North America.

Early life and education

Career

Other activities
 Tenaris, Independent Member of the Board of Directors

Personal life

References

Sources
 Diccionario biográfico del gobierno mexicano, Ed. Fondo de Cultura Económica, Mexico, 1992.
 SAI Consulting

1955 births
Living people
Mexican economists
Academic staff of El Colegio de México
El Colegio de México alumni
National Autonomous University of Mexico alumni
People from Mexico City
Mexican Secretaries of Finance
Mexican Secretaries of Commerce and Industry